Sesamex, also called sesoxane, is an organic compound used as a synergist; that is, it enhances the potency of pesticides such pyrethrins and pyrethroids, but is itself not a pesticide.

Solubility
Sesamex is soluble in kerosene, freon 11, and freon 12.

References

Insecticides
Benzodioxoles
Phenol ethers